Reinhard Goebel (born 31 July 1952 in Siegen, West Germany) is a German conductor and violinist specialising in early music on authentic instruments and professor for historical performance at the Mozarteum in Salzburg. Goebel received his first violin lessons at the age of twelve.

In 1973 Goebel founded his early music ensemble Musica Antiqua Köln that he led until its dissolution in 2007. He has been an important figure in early music and, for example, was instrumental in rediscovering the music of composers such as Marc-Antoine Charpentier and the Dresden court composers Johann David Heinichen and Jan Dismas Zelenka.

External links
Reinhard Goebel biography, Bach-Cantatas.com

German male conductors (music)
German classical violinists
Male classical violinists
German male violinists
1952 births
Living people
German performers of early music
Baroque-violin players
21st-century German conductors (music)
21st-century classical violinists
21st-century German male musicians